The Boand System was a system for determining the college football national championship. It was also known as the Azzi Ratem system (derived from "As I rate 'em").  The system was developed by William F. Boand.  The rankings were based on mathematical formula. The Boand System is recognized as a "National Champion Major Selector" by the Official NCAA Division I Records Book.

Boand announced annual national champions on a current basis from 1930 to 1960.  He also chose national champions on a retroactive basis for the years from 1919 to 1929. In the 1937 edition of The Illustrated Football Annual Boand went back and re-rated the seasons since 1924, this time including bowl game results in his calculations.

The rankings appeared in many newspapers, the Illustrated Football Annual from 1932-1942, and Football News from 1942 to 1944 and again from 1951 to 1960.  The design of the system sought to combine the best parts of the Dickinson System, with mathematical systems developed by Ralph Powell of Ohio State University and William T. Van de Graaff, football coach and mathematics instructor at Colorado College.  Prominent football coaches Knute Rockne, Howard Jones, and Pop Warner consulted with Boand on the rankings.  At various times, the system was applied to high school football rankings.

National champions

Boand trophy

In February 1955 coach Woody Hayes was presented with the William F. Boand trophy in recognition of the 1954 Buckeyes' No. 1 selection in the year's final Azzi Ratem rankings. The award was presented by Byron F. Boyd, editor of Football News magazine, which carried Boand's ratings.

See also
NCAA Division I FBS national football championship

Further reading

References

College football championships
College football awards organizations